Lurigancho-Chosica is a district of Lima Province, Peru, located in the valley of the Rímac River, which it shares with neighboring Chaclacayo and Ate districts. Its capital is the town of Chosica.

According to a 2002 estimate by the INEI, the district has 125,088 inhabitants and a population density of 529 persons/km². In 1999, there were 32,327 households in the district.

Its capital, Chosica, is located in the extreme east of the district, near the border with the Province of Huarochirí. Lurigancho counts on a Minor Populated Center inside the urban core of Lima, which is Santa María de Huachipa which is located in the extreme west of the district and adjacent to San Juan de Lurigancho. Other notable urban areas in this zone are Jicamarca and Cajamarquilla, where one of the principal zinc refineries of the country is located. In the mountain zone in proximity to the refinery is located the Jicamarca Radio Observatory.

History 
The district was created on January 2, 1857,  with the town of Lurigancho (in the current San Juan de Lurigancho district) as its capital. It had a population of 1248 inhabitants, most of them dedicated to agricultural activities, according to the census of 1876.

Boundaries

 North: Huarochirí Province in the Lima Region
 East: Huarochirí Province
 South: Chaclacayo and Ate
 West: San Juan de Lurigancho

Education

Colegio Peruano-Alemán Beata Imelda, a German school, is in the district.

Colegio 0058 Cusco

See also 
 Administrative divisions of Peru

References

External links
 Official municipal website (www.munichosica.pe)
chosica.com – Portal of the town of Chosica

Districts of Lima